Polokwane Ext 44 (meaning "Place of Safety" in Northern Sotho; alternatively Greenside Ext 44 or simply Ext 44), is a township in Polokwane under the Capricorn District Municipality in the Limpopo province of South Africa.

Ext 44 was the first township to ever emerge from the City of Polokwane, despite experiencing the heavy rains and floods throughout the years, the township is known for its never dying criminal activities.

Education 
 Kabelo Secondary School
 Greenside Primary School

References

External links 
 
 
 

Polokwane
Townships in Limpopo
Populated places in the Polokwane Local Municipality